Benton Township, Illinois refers to one of the following places:

Benton Township, Franklin County, Illinois
Benton Township, Lake County, Illinois

See also

Benton Township (disambiguation)

Illinois township disambiguation pages